Waraf is a sub-district located in Jiblah District, Ibb Governorate, Yemen. Waraf had a population of 17,342 according to the 2004 census.

References 

Sub-districts in Jiblah District